Yaqub Salimov (/) served as Minister of the Interior of Tajikistan from December 1993 to 1995

Career 
Salimov, described as a 'mafia' figure by Olivier Roy, was allegedly involved in smuggling and racketeering during the Soviet era. In 1990, Yaqub Salimov was convicted for taking part in the Dushanbe riots. When the Tajikistani Civil War broke out, Salimov was released from prison, and became a leader of Popular Front, a paramilitary group fighting on the government side. Salimov became a leader of the Kulabi faction, because his mafia was simply the expression of Kulabi solidarity networks, with access to arms and money, according to Olivier Roy.

He was appointed Minister of Internal Affairs of Tajikistan in December 1993. In 1995 he was relieved of this post and was made Ambassador to Turkey. In 1997, he was charged with attempting a coup d'etat. Afterwards, he fled from Tajikistan but was arrested in Moscow in 2003 and extradited to Tajikistan.
On April 25, 2005, he received 15 years in prison sentence. Yaqub Salimov was released on June 21, 2016.

References

Living people
People from Khatlon Region
Tajikistani gangsters
Prisoners and detainees of the Soviet Union
Ambassadors of Tajikistan to Turkey
Tajikistani prisoners and detainees
Prisoners and detainees of Tajikistan
Interior ministers of Tajikistan
People extradited from Russia
People extradited to Tajikistan
Year of birth missing (living people)